Spring(s) may refer to:

Common uses
 Spring (season), a season of the year
 Spring (device), a mechanical device that stores energy
 Spring (hydrology), a natural source of water
 Spring (mathematics), a geometric surface in the shape of a helically coiled tube
 Spring (political terminology), often used to name periods of political liberalization
 Springs (tide), in oceanography, the maximum tide, occurs twice a month during the full and new moon

Places
 Spring (Milz), a river in Thuringia, Germany
 Spring, Alabel, a barangay unit in Alabel, Sarangani Province, Philippines
 Șpring, a commune in Alba County, Romania
 Șpring (river), a river in Alba County, Romania
 Springs, Gauteng, South Africa
 Springs, the location of Dubai British School, Dubai

United States
 Springs, New York, a part of East Hampton, New York
 Springs, Pennsylvania, an unincorporated community
 Spring, Texas, a census-designated place
 Spring District, neighborhood in Bellevue, Washington

People
 Spring (surname), including a list of people with the name

Groups
 Spring baronets, of Pakenham
 Spring family, English noble family

People with the given name
 Spring Byington (1886–1971), American actress

Arts, entertainment and media

Paintings
The Spring (La Primavera), by Giuseppe Arcimboldo
 Spring (painting), an 1894 oil painting by Lawrence Alma-Tadema
 The Spring (or La Source), a painting by Francis Picabia
 Primavera (Botticelli) (English translation: Spring), a painting by Sandro Botticelli, c. 1482
 Spring, a painting by Édouard Manet
 Spring, a painting by Christopher Williams

Film
 In Spring (1929 film) (Весной), a Soviet film
 Springtime (1947 film) (Весна), a Soviet film
 Spring (1969 film), an Estonian film
 Spring (2014 film), an American romantic science fiction horror film
 Spring (2019 film), a computer-animated short film created by the Blender Institute

Television 
 "Spring" (Pee-wee's Playhouse), an episode of Pee-wee's Playhouse
 Spring (TV series), a Flemish-Belgian television series

Literature
 Spring (Runelords), a character in The Runelords series of fantasy novels by David Farland
 Spring (Kevade), a novel by Oskar Luts, basis for the 1969 film

Music

Groups
 Spring (band), an English band, or the band's only album
 Spring (Belgian band), a group that performed at Marktrock in 2004
 American Spring, a 1970s pop music duo, known from 1971/'72 as "Spring"
 Springs, a Japanese band, formed by Aya Hirano, Yuuki Yoshida, Ayaka Itō

Albums and EPs
 Spring (Wallows EP), 2018
 Spring (Akdong Musician EP), 2016
 Spring (American Spring album), 1972
 Spring (April EP), 2016
 Spring (Cyann & Ben album), 2004
 Spring (Jon Foreman EP), 2008
 Spring (Tony Williams album), 1965
 Spring (single album), by Park Bom, 2019
 Spring, an album by Clay Hart, 1969
 Spring, an EP by Subtle, 2003
 Spring!, an album by The Lettermen, (1967)
 The Blake Project: Spring, an album by Finn Coren, 1997
 Spring: The Appendix, a follow-up album, 1998

Songs
 "Spring" (Rammstein song)
 "Spring" (song), a 1996 song by RMB

Classical works
 "Spring" (concerto), "La primavera", from Vivaldi's The Four Seasons
 Spring (Rachmaninoff), a 1902 cantata by Sergei Rachmaninoff
 "Spring" (sonata), Violin Sonata No. 5 by Beethoven
 In Spring, a symphony by John Knowles Paine
 Spring Quartet, String Quartet No. 14 by Mozart
 Spring Symphony, a symphony by Benjamin Britten
 Symphony No. 1 (Schumann) (Spring), by Robert Schumann
"Spring", song by Frédéric Chopin

Other media
 Spring: A Journal of Archetype and Culture, a psychology journal

Brands and organizations
 Spring (company), a computer software company owned by Pivotal Software
 Spring (formerly Teespring), an e-commerce company that allows people to create and sell custom apparel
 Spring (store), a Canada-based shoe retailer
 Spring Airlines, a Chinese airline
 Spring! (brand), a brand of bottled water
 Springs Global, a Brazil-based corporation
 Spring (political party), a movement in Poland
 SPRING Singapore, a governmental department of Singapore
Dacia Spring, an electric city car

Science and technology
 Spring green, occurs between green and cyan in the visible spectrum

Computing
 Spring (application), an E-commerce platform
 Spring (game engine), an open-source RTS engine
 Spring (operating system), an experimental operating system from Sun Microsystems
 SPRING, a GIS and remote-sensing image-processing system with an object-oriented data-model
 Spring Framework, an application-framework for the Java platform

Other uses
 Sacred spring, a revered spring or well
 Spring (building), a residential condominium in Austin, Texas, US
 Springs Christian Academy, a private school in Winnipeg, Manitoba, Canada
 Forward or aft spring, a method of mooring a vessel to a shore fixture
Spring (given name)

See also

 
 
 :Category:Spring (season), for articles related to the season
 :Category:Springs, for articles related to the water source
 :Category:Springs (mechanical), for articles related to the device
 Fountain (disambiguation)
 Hooke's law, for the mathematical model of certain processes
 Primavera (disambiguation)
 Printemps (disambiguation)
 Spring Creek (disambiguation)
 Spring equinox (disambiguation)
 Spring Lake (disambiguation)
 Spring River (disambiguation)
 Spring Township (disambiguation)
 Springer (disambiguation)
 Springfield (disambiguation)
 Springtime (disambiguation)
 Springville (disambiguation)
 Sprung (disambiguation)

English feminine given names